The Jackson Collins House (aka "The Red Brick House" to those who have lived there) in Centreville, Maryland was built in 1887 of pressed brick.  The plan and roof forms are unusually complex.  The house's style is a mixture of Queen Anne and Italianate style, unusually expressed in brick.

References

External links 
 , including photo in 1978, at Maryland Historical Trust

Houses on the National Register of Historic Places in Maryland
Queen Anne architecture in Maryland
Houses in Queen Anne's County, Maryland
Italianate architecture in Maryland
Houses completed in 1887
National Register of Historic Places in Queen Anne's County, Maryland